is a city located in central Aichi Prefecture, Japan. , the city had an estimated population of 62,782 in 24,260 households, and a population density of 1,950 persons per km2.

Geography
Miysohi is situated in central Aichi Prefecture.

Climate
The city has a climate characterized by hot and humid summers, and relatively mild winters (Köppen climate classification Cfa).  The average annual temperature in Miyoshi is 15.7 °C. The average annual rainfall is 1598 mm with September as the wettest month. The temperatures are highest on average in August, at around 28.08 °C, and lowest in January, at around 4.1 °C.

Demographics
Per Japanese census data, the population of Miyoshi has grown drastically over the past 60 years.

Neighboring municipalities
Aichi Prefecture
Toyota
Nisshin
Kariya
Tōgō

History

Early modern period
“Miyoshi" as a local place name appears in documents in the Edo period.

Late modern period
Miyoshi Village was created within Nishikamo District, Aichi Prefecture on October 1, 1889, with the establishment of the modern municipalities system in the early Meiji period.

Contemporary history
Miyoshi merged with neighboring villages in 1906 to reach its present geographic borders and was raised to town status on April 1, 1958.

During 2003–2005, discussions were held to merge Miyoshi with the city of Toyota, but the merger proposal was strongly opposed by the majority of the inhabitants of Miyoshi.

As a result, the merger did not take place, and instead Miyoshi was elevated to city status on January 4, 2010.

With its change in status, Miyoshi changed the spelling of its name from kanji (三好) to hiragana (みよし)

Government

Miyoshi has a mayor-council form of government with a directly elected mayor and a unicameral city legislature of 20 members. The city contributes one member to the Aichi Prefectural Assembly.  In terms of national politics, the city is part of Aichi District 11 of the lower house of the Diet of Japan.

External relations

Twin towns – Sister cities

International
Friendship city
Columbus（Indiana, United States of America）
since February 16, 1995

National
Friendship city
Shibetsu（Kamikawa Subprefecture, Hokkaidō） 
since October 6, 2000
Kiso（Nagano Prefecture, Chūbu region）
since October 14, 1983

Economy
Miyoshi is a regional commercial center, and has a very industrial economy, with many factories producing automobiles or automotive-related components, mostly connected with Toyota Corporation. Residual agriculture is mostly horticulture

Education

University
Tokai Gakuen University

Schools
Miyoshi has eight public elementary schools and four public junior high schools operated by the city government, and one public high school operated by the Aichi Prefectural Board of Education. The prefecture also operates one special education school for the handicapped.

Transportation

Railways

Conventional lines
 Meitetsu
Toyota Line：-  –  –

Roads

Expressway
 Tōmei Expressway
：- Tōmei-Miyoshi IC –

Japan National Route

Notable people from Miyoshi
Tomoko Ohta, scientist
Hitomi Yoshizawa, former leader of J-Pop Girlgroup Morning Musume, soloist in Hello!Project

References

External links

  

 
Cities in Aichi Prefecture